Tom Redmond (born September 21, 1937) is a former professional American football defensive lineman in the National Football League (NFL). He played college football for Vanderbilt. He played six seasons for the St. Louis Cardinals from 1960 to 1965.

Children: Cindy, Jennifer, Tim, Greg, Kelly, and Melissa 

Grandchildren:Tomas, Daniel, Sam, Clare, Luke, Ethan, Sara, Iris, Claire, and Hana

References

1937 births
Living people
Players of American football from Atlanta
American football defensive tackles
Vanderbilt Commodores football players
St. Louis Cardinals (football) players